Lamba, is a small village in the bottom of the inlet of Lambavík on the east coast of Eysturoy, Faroe Islands.

There are similarly named places, Lamba in Shetland and Lambay in Ireland.

Settlement
The houses in Lamba are spread down through the valley following the road on its way from the bottom of the valley down to the small harbour.

There is a huge rock in the harbour. Nobody wants to remove it because it is said to be inhabited by ‘huldufólk’, a race of elfs or faries that people used to believe in. They are said to be fierce if disturbed.

Heri Joensen of Viking metal band Týr is from Lamba.

See also
 List of towns in the Faroe Islands

References

External links
Faroeislands.dk: Lambi Images and description of all cities on the Faroe Islands.

Populated places in the Faroe Islands